Odoreu is a commune of 4,800 inhabitants situated in Satu Mare County, Romania. It is composed of six villages: Berindan (Berend), Cucu, Eteni, Mărtinești (Krasznaszentmárton), Odoreu and Vânătorești (Gombáserdő).

Demographics
Ethnic groups (2002 census): 
Romanians: 69.33%
Hungarians: 26.77%
Roma: 3.46%

According to mother tongue, 69.45% speak Romanian as their first language and 30.33% of the population speak Hungarian.

References

Communes in Satu Mare County